Szabad Föld (Hungarian: Free Land or Soil) is a weekly newspaper published in Budapest, Hungary. The paper has been in circulation since 1945.

History and profile
Szabad Föld was established in 1945. The paper is published on a weekly basis and appears on Fridays. It was the organ of the People’s Patriotic Front and of the working peasantry during the communist rule in Hungary.

In the late 1990s the Attila József Foundation was the co-owner of Szabad Föld. The Geoholding media group became the owner of the weekly in July 2004 when it purchased paper's owner, Book Publisher Rt. Its publisher is Szabad Lap Publisher Kft.

The headquarters of Szabad Föld is in Budapest. However, its target audience is non-urban people, and it mostly covers local and agricultural issues. In fact, the paper was called as peasants' newspaper or countryside weekly during its initial phase. At that time the paper financed winter-evening lectures in the country.

Lajos Feher served as the editor-in-chief of Szabad Föld. As of 2010 its editor-in-chief was László Horváth.

Circulation
In 1976 Szabad Föld sold 350,000 copies. Its circulation was 176,385 copies in 2002. In 2003 the weekly had a circulation of 160,000 copies. The paper sold 115,326 copies in 2009, making it the second most read weekly in the country. The circulation of the paper was 82,261 copies in 2013. Its circulation decreased to 37,859 in 2022.

See also
 List of newspapers in Hungary

References

External links
 Szabad Föld

1945 establishments in Hungary
Communist newspapers
Eastern Bloc mass media
Hungarian-language newspapers
Newspapers established in 1945
Newspapers published in Budapest
Weekly newspapers published in Hungary